Elektra Records Co. v. Gem Electronic Distributors, Inc., 360 F. Supp. 821 (E.D.N.Y. 1973), was an important case before the United States District Court for the Eastern District of New York that concerned copyright infringement, which held that secondary persons or entities could be liable for that tort under certain circumstances, and is also called the "'make-a-tape' case".

The facts were that:

Federal courts have held that secondary tort liability exists when:

Knowledge of the infringement of the copyright is the essential element that Elektra Records developed.

Impact
This case was used as a precedent for the US Supreme Court cases of Sony Corp. of America v. Universal City Studios, Inc., 125 S. Ct. 2764 (1984) and MGM Studios, Inc. v. Grokster, Ltd., 464 U.S. 417 (2005).

See also
 Copyright

References

External links
 

United States copyright case law
United States district court cases
1973 in United States case law
1973 in New York (state)